The Grote Prijs Stad Geel was a one-day road cycling race held annually in the province of Antwerp, Belgium. It was organized by the municipality of Geel. It was part of the UCI Europe Tour in category 1.2 from 2010 until its final edition in 2013.

Winners

References

Cycle races in Belgium
UCI Europe Tour races
Recurring sporting events established in 1950
1950 establishments in Belgium
Defunct cycling races in Belgium
2013 disestablishments in Belarus
Recurring sporting events disestablished in 2013